Hemanter Pakhi (English title: Autumn Bird (2002)) is an Indian Bengali feature film directed by Urmi Chakraborty.

Plot
A Bengali housewife takes up a writing career after 23 years of marriage. She is introduced to a new world and new friends. Her work gets appreciated, and this in turn brings a new twist in her life. She starts discovering her husband and her beloved children in a new light. This creates trouble in her family, and she sacrifices her dream for the sake of her family.

Cast
 Tanushree Shankar
 Parambrata Chatterjee
 Soumitra Chatterjee
 Santu Mukhopadhyay
 Swastika Mukherjee
 Mamata Shankar
 Biswajit Chakraborty
 Bodhisattwa Majumdar
 Soma Chakraborty
 Koushik Bhattacharya

Awards
 National Film Award for Best Feature Film in Bengali (2002)

References

External links
 Tolly Film Review - Hemanter Pakhi
 Hemanter Pakhi
 Hemanter Pakhi
 Film Catalogue - Autumn Bird

2002 films
2000s Bengali-language films
Bengali-language Indian films
Films set in Kolkata
Best Bengali Feature Film National Film Award winners
National Film Development Corporation of India films
Films based on works by Suchitra Bhattacharya